Daniel Coker (1780–1846), born Isaac Wright, was an African American of mixed race from Baltimore, Maryland; after he gained freedom from slavery, he became a Methodist minister. He wrote one of the few pamphlets published in the South that protested against slavery and supported abolition. In 1816 he helped found the African Methodist Episcopal Church, the first independent black denomination in the United States, at its first national convention in Philadelphia.

In 1820, Coker took his family and immigrated to the British colony of Sierra Leone, where he was the first Methodist missionary from a Western nation. There Coker founded the West Africa Methodist Church. He and his descendants continued as leaders among the ethnic group that developed as the Creole people in Sierra Leone.

Early life
He was born into slavery as Isaac Wright, in 1780 in Baltimore, or Frederick County, Maryland, to Susan Coker, a white woman, and Edward Wright, an enslaved African American. Under a 1664 Maryland slave law, Wright was considered a slave as his father was enslaved. (Another source said that his mother was an enslaved black and his father white.)

Beginning in the colonial period, Maryland had added restrictions on unions between white women and black slaves. Under a 1692 Maryland law, white women who had children with slaves would be punished by being sold as indentured servants for seven years and binding their mixed-race children to serve indentures until the age of twenty-one if the woman was married to the slave, and until age thirty-one if she was not married to the father.(Such interracial marriages were later prohibited by law.) Growing up in a household with his white Coker half-brothers, Wright attended primary school with them, serving as their valet. A white half-brother was said to have refused to go to school without him.

As a teenager, Wright escaped to New York. There he changed his name to Daniel Coker and joined the Methodist Episcopal Church. Coker received a license to preach from Francis Asbury, a British missionary who had immigrated to the United States and planted numerous frontier churches during his career. He also rode large circuits to minister to people on the frontier.

Coker returned to Baltimore. For a time he passed as his white half-brother. Friends helped him purchase his freedom from his master, to secure his legal status. As a free black, he could teach at a local school for black children. By this time, Baltimore was a center of a growing population of free blacks, generally free people of color, including a number manumitted after the Revolutionary War.

Methodist minister

In 1802, Francis Asbury ordained Coker as a deacon in the Methodist Episcopal Church. He actively opposed slavery and wrote pamphlets in protest. In 1810, Coker wrote and published the pamphlet Dialogue between a Virginian and an African minister, described by historian and critic Dorothy Porter as resembling a "scholastic dialogue". It is noted for its literary quality and because it was one of the few protest pamphlets "written and published in the slaveholding South."

While working at Sharp Street Church, Coker began to advocate for black Methodists to withdraw from the white-dominated church. He founded the African Bethel Church, which later became known as Bethel A.M.E. Church.

In 1807, Coker founded the Bethel Charity School, a school for Black children. One of his students was William J. Watkins, who became an abolitionist and opposed the proposed resettlement of free American blacks in Africa. Coker himself later participated in such colonization.

In 1816, Coker traveled to Philadelphia, where he represented his church and collaborated with Richard Allen of that city in organizing the national African Methodist Episcopal Church. It was founded by several congregations, mostly in the mid-Atlantic region, as the first independent black denomination in the United States. Coker was elected as the first bishop by the delegates, but he deferred to Allen. The latter minister had founded the first AME Church in Philadelphia, known as Mother Bethel A.M.E. Church, and encouraged the planting of new congregations in the mid-Atlantic region. Coker represented Bethel A.M.E. Church (founded 1787/1797) in Baltimore.

Coker encountered difficulties after his return to Baltimore. In 1818 church elders dismissed him from the Connection because of "undisclosed charges"; the following year he was readmitted but could preach only by approval of a local minister. Although he continued teaching, he could not support his family. In 1820 he decided to emigrate with his family as a missionary to Africa, under the aegis of the American Colonization Society.

Emigration to Western Africa

Early in 1820, Daniel Coker sailed for Africa on board the Elizabeth. He was among 86 African-American emigrants assisted by the American Colonization Society (ACS). Made up of a range of leaders from the North and South, the ACS advocated resettling free American blacks in West Africa. Both slaveholders and some abolitionists thought they faced too much discrimination in the United States to succeed, and slaveholders believed that free blacks threatened the stability of the slave societies established in the South.

The passengers on the Elizabeth were the first African-American settlers in what was started as a private American colony and is now Liberia. (Their descendants developed as an ethnic group known as the Krio people.)

Coker was one of four AME missionaries on the Elizabeth. In transit and ten days from New York City, he organized the first foreign branch of the AME Church.

The ACS planned to settle a colony at Sherbro Island, now within Sierra Leone, which was then a British colony. The newcomers were not used to the local diseases, and quickly became ill. The area was swampy, resulting in many mosquitoes that carried disease. All but one of the twelve white colonists and one-third of the African Americans died, including three of the four missionaries. Just before dying, the expedition's leader (Samuel Bacon) asked Coker to take charge of the venture. He helped the remaining colonists get through their despair and to survive.

Coker led the group to seek another location on the mainland. He and his family settled in Hastings, Sierra Leone, a newly founded village about 15 miles from the first settlement of Freetown. It was intended for Liberated Africans freed by the British Navy from illegal slave ships, as the transatlantic slave trade had been banned by Britain and the United States. Hastings was one of several new villages developed by the Church Missionary Society, which was active in the colony. Coker became the patriarch of a prominent Creole family, the Cokers. Coker's son, Daniel Coker Jr., became a leader in the town of Freetown. Coker descendants still reside in Freetown and are among the prominent Creole families. Other members of the expedition settled in what became Liberia.

In 1891 Henry McNeal Turner, the 12th bishop of the A.M.E. Church, elaborated on Coker's achievements, writing, 
"It would seem, from all I can learn, that Coker played a prominent part in the early settlement of Liberia. The first Methodist Church established here was the African M. E. Church; but by whom established I cannot say. Tradition says it was afterward sold out to the M. E. Church. Besides the probability of Rev. Daniel Coker's having established our church here, he also played a mighty part among the early settlers of Sierra Leone. His children and grandchildren are found there to-day."

See also

Liberia
Sierra Leone
Mother Bethel A.M.E. Church
Sharp Street Memorial United Methodist Church and Community House
Paul Cuffe
Henry McNeal Turner
David Brion Davis
Lott Cary

References

Sources

http://news.bbc.co.uk/2/hi/talking_point/740557.stm

Becoming African in America: Race and Nation in the Early Black Atlantic by James Sidbury
Journal of Daniel Coker, a Descendant of Africa: From the Time of Leaving By Daniel Coker

Chapter 7 "Edward Jones: An African American in Sierra Leone." in Moving On: Black Loyalists in the Afro-Atlantic World by Nemata Blyden
http://www.hastingsandryecons.org.uk/index.php?sectionid=3&pagenumber=97
https://web.archive.org/web/20070729075256/http://www.hastingsbme.org.uk/newsletter/BMESpring07new.pdf

External links

1780 births
1846 deaths
Religious leaders from Baltimore
American Methodist missionaries
18th-century American slaves
Free Negroes
Methodist missionaries in Sierra Leone
Sierra Leone Creole people
Sierra Leonean people of African-American descent
Sierra Leonean people of British descent
African Methodist Episcopal bishops
African-American missionaries